Thinning (ecology)
 Thinning (morphology)
 "The Thinning" (movie)
 In engineering, a reduction in viscosity

See also
 Thinner (disambiguation)